Yang Fang may refer to:

Yang Fang (general) (1770–1846), Han Chinese general and diplomat during the Qing Dynasty
Yang Fang (figure skater) (born 1984), Chinese ice dancer